The Horten H.VI was a flying wing aircraft designed by the Horten brothers during World War II.

Based on the Horten H.IV, the H.VI was an enlarged version of the H.IV, with the goal of comparing their flying wing designs against the very large span Akaflieg Darmstadt D-30 Cirrus.

The H.VI was allocated the RLM ID number 8-253 and by inference Horten Ho 253 though this was little used in practice.

Specifications (H.VI V2)

References

Flying wings
1940s German sailplanes
H06
Glider aircraft
Prone pilot aircraft